() is an Arabic word meaning 'center' or 'middle ground'. It may refer to:

Media

Music
"Wasat", a song on Com Truise's EP Wave 1 (2014)

Newspapers
Alwasat (Bahraini newspaper), a daily in Bahrain
Alwasat (Kuwaiti newspaper), a daily in Kuwait

Politics
Al-Wasat Party, an Islamist political party in Egypt
Muslim Centre Party, a political party in Jordan
Center Party (Iraq), a political movement in Iraq

Other uses
Delta Geminorum, a star formally named Wasat

See also
 Moderation in Islam
 Moderate Islam